In graph theory, the Cartesian product   of graphs  and  is a graph such that:
The Cartesian product of graphs is sometimes called the box product of graphs [Harary 1969].

The notation  has often been used for Cartesian products of graphs, but is now more commonly used for another construction known as the tensor product of graphs. The square symbol is intended to be an intuitive and unambiguous notation for the Cartesian product, since it shows visually the four edges resulting from the Cartesian product of two edges.

Examples
 The Cartesian product of two edges is a cycle on four vertices: K2K2 = C4.
 The Cartesian product of K2 and a path graph is a ladder graph.
 The Cartesian product of two path graphs is a grid graph.
 The Cartesian product of n edges is a hypercube: 
 
Thus, the Cartesian product of two hypercube graphs is another hypercube: QiQj = Qi+j. 
 The Cartesian product of two median graphs is another median graph.
 The graph of vertices and edges of an n-prism is the Cartesian product graph K2Cn.
 The rook's graph is the Cartesian product of two complete graphs.

Properties 
If a connected graph is a Cartesian product, it can be factorized uniquely as a product of prime factors, graphs that cannot themselves be decomposed as products of graphs. However,  describe a disconnected graph that can be expressed in two different ways as a Cartesian product of prime graphs:

where the plus sign denotes disjoint union and the superscripts denote exponentiation over Cartesian products.

A Cartesian product is vertex transitive if and only if each of its factors is.

A Cartesian product is bipartite if and only if each of its factors is. More generally, the chromatic number of the Cartesian product satisfies the equation 
 
The Hedetniemi conjecture states a related equality for the tensor product of graphs. The independence number of a Cartesian product is not so easily calculated, but as  showed it satisfies the inequalities

The Vizing conjecture states that the domination number of a Cartesian product satisfies the inequality

The Cartesian product of unit distance graphs is another unit distance graph.

Cartesian product graphs can be recognized efficiently, in linear time.

Algebraic graph theory 
Algebraic graph theory can be used to analyse the Cartesian graph product.
If the graph  has  vertices and the  adjacency matrix , and the graph  has  vertices and the  adjacency matrix , then the adjacency matrix of the Cartesian product of both graphs is given by
 ,
where  denotes the Kronecker product of matrices and  denotes the  identity matrix. The adjacency matrix of the Cartesian graph product is therefore the Kronecker sum of the adjacency matrices of the factors.

Category theory 
Viewing a graph as a category whose objects are the vertices and whose morphisms are the paths in the graph, the cartesian product of graphs corresponds to the funny tensor product of categories. The cartesian product of graphs is one of two graph products that turn the category of graphs and graph homomorphisms into a symmetric closed monoidal category (as opposed to merely symmetric monoidal), the other being the tensor product of graphs.

History 

Notes

References 
.
.
.
.
.
.
.
.
.
.
.
.

External links 

Graph products